Jamshid Abol Hassen Bakhtiar (January 8, 1934 – January 9, 2022) was an American football player. 

Bakhtiar was born in Tehran, Iran, on January 8, 1934, and emigrated to the United States as a boy. He attended the University of Virginia where he played college football at the fullback and placekicker positions for the Virginia Cavaliers football team from 1955 to 1957. In September 1956, he set an Atlantic Coast Conference single-game record  with 210 rushing yards against VMI.  He was selected by the Football Writers Association of America as a first-team back on its 1957 College Football All-America Team. He later played in the Canadian Football League with the Calgary Stampeders in 1958 before enrolling in medical school at the University of Virginia. 

He graduated with a medical degree with an emphasis in psychiatry in 1963. He returned to Iran where he established the country's first modern psychiatric unit. Following the Iranian Revolution, he fled to Turkey with his family and returned to the United States.

Bakhtiar's sister was Laleh, a scholar, author, translator, and clinical psychologist. His nieces are NPR producer, journalist, and author Davar Ardalan and novelist Lailee Bakhtiar McNair; his nephew is former tennis player Fred McNair.

He died on January 9, 2022, one day after his 88th birthday.

References

1934 births
2022 deaths
American football fullbacks
American psychiatrists
Calgary Stampeders players
Virginia Cavaliers football players
Iranian players of American football
Sportspeople from Tehran
Iranian emigrants to the United States
Sportspeople of Iranian descent